María Guadalupe Sánchez Gómez (born January 3, 1977 in Ciudad de México, Distrito Federal) is a female race walker from Mexico.

Achievements

References
sports-reference

1977 births
Living people
Mexican female racewalkers
Athletes (track and field) at the 2000 Summer Olympics
Olympic athletes of Mexico
Athletes from Mexico City